John Michael Shewchuk (June 19, 1917 — May 15, 1989) was a Canadian professional ice hockey defenceman. Shewchuk played in the National Hockey League for the Boston Bruins between 1938 and 1945, playing a total of 187 regular season games and 20 playoff games. He won the Stanley Cup with the Bruins in 1941. The rest of his career, which lasted from 1937 to 1952, was mainly spent in the American Hockey League. He was born in Brantford, Ontario.

Career statistics

Regular season and playoffs

External links

Picture of Jack Shewchuk's Name on the 1941 Stanley Cup Plaque

1917 births
1989 deaths
Boston Bruins players
Canadian expatriates in the United States
Canadian ice hockey defencemen
Canadian people of Ukrainian descent
Hershey Bears players
Ice hockey people from Ontario
Ontario Hockey Association Senior A League (1890–1979) players
Providence Reds players
St. Louis Flyers players
Sportspeople from Brantford
Stanley Cup champions